Zayeltsovskaya is a station on the Leninskaya Line of the Novosibirsk Metro. It opened on April 2, 1992.

Novosibirsk Metro stations
Railway stations in Russia opened in 1992
Zayeltsovsky City District, Novosibirsk
Railway stations located underground in Russia